James or Jim Paxson may refer to:
James M. Paxson (died 1995), American businessman
Jim Paxson Sr. (1932–2014), American basketball player
Jim Paxson (born 1957), American basketball player